The Manufacture d'Armes de Saint-Étienne, often abbreviated to MAS ("Saint-Étienne Weapons Factory" in English) was a French state-owned weapons manufacturer in the town of Saint-Étienne, Loire.  Founded in 1764,  it was merged into the French state-owned defense conglomerate GIAT Industries in 2001.

History 
Saint-Étienne was well-known as a center of sword and knife manufacturing beginning in the Middle Ages. In 1665, a Royal Arms Depot was created in Paris to store military weapons made in Saint-Étienne.

The Manufacture d'Armes de Saint-Étienne was created by royal decree in 1764 under the supervision of the General Inspector of the Royal Arms Manufacture of Charleville.

12,000 weapons were being produced each year when the French Revolution began in 1789. The city was renamed Armsville during the Revolutionary period and production increased to arm the French Revolutionary Army.

Subsequently, the French Empire required a threefold increase in production to meet the needs of the Grande Armée in its conquest of Europe.

By 1838, during the July Monarchy, annual production was well over 30,000 firearms.

In 1864, the modern factory was built, new steam-powered machines were installed and the first military standardized bolt-action rifle, the Chassepot, was produced from 1866 on, then the Gras rifle after 1874.

The MAC-designed Lebel rifle entered production in 1886. MAS later designed and manufactured the family of rifles chambered in 7.5×54mm French, from the MAS-36 through the MAS-49/56, then later the FAMAS bullpup assault rifle, which uses the 5.56×45mm NATO round.

In 2001, weapons production ceased as MAS was absorbed into the Nexter Group.  OPTSYS, a Nexter subsidiary specializing in optical equipment and protected vision for armored vehicles, is currently located in Saint-Étienne.

Arms produced by MAS

 Pistolet modèle 1733
 Fusil d'infanterie de 17,5 mm modèle 1777
 Fusil d'infanterie de 17,5 mm modèle 1777 modifié an IX
 Pistolet de cavalerie de 17,1 mm modèle an IX
 Pistolet de 17,1 mm de cavalerie modèle an XIII
 Fusil d'infanterie de 17,5 mm modèle 1816
 Mousqueton de cavalerie modèle 1816
 Mousqueton de cavalerie modèle 1816C
 Mousqueton de cavalerie modèle 1822
 Fusil d'infanterie de 17,5 mm modèle 1822
 Fusil d'infanterie modèle 1822T
 Fusil d'infanterie de 18 mm modèle 1822T bis
 Fusil de rempart modèle 1828
 Fusil de rempart de 21,8 mm modèle 1831
 Fusil de voltigeur modèle 1842
 Fusil d'infanterie de 17,5 mm modèle 1842
 Fusil de marine modèle 1842 T
 Fusil de dragon modèle 1842 T
 Mousqueton de gendarmerie modèle 1842 T
 Fusil d'infanterie de 18 mm modèle 1842 T
 Carabine de Chasseurs a pied 1853
 Carabine de Chasseurs a pied 1853 T
 Fusil d'infanterie de 17,8 mm modèle 1857
 Fusil de marine modèle 1857
 Fusil de dragon modèle 1857
 Mousqueton de gendarmerie modèle 1857
 Fusil à tabatière système 1857
 fusil d'infanterie de 11 mm modèle 1866 Chassepot
revolver de 11 mm modèle 1873
revolver de 11 mm modèle 1874
fusil d'infanterie de 11 mm Gras modèle 1866-74
fusil d'infanterie de 11 mm Gras modèle 1874
fusil d'infanterie de 11 mm Gras modèle 1866-74 M80
fusil d'infanterie de 11 mm Gras modèle 1874 M80
fusil d'infanterie modèle 1874 M80 M14
Fusil d'infanterie de 8 mm modèle 1886 Lebel
Fusil d'infanterie de 8 mm modèle 1886/93, Lebel
Fusil de 8 mm modèle 1886 M93 de tireur d'élite
Mousqueton de cavalerie modèle 1890
Carabine de cuirassier 1890
Carabine de gendarmerie 1890
Mousqueton d’artillerie modèle 1892
Mousqueton d’artillerie modèle 1892 M16
Revolver de 8 mm modèle 1892
Canon de 75 Modèle 1897
Fusil de 8 mm de tirailleurs indochinois modèle 1902, Berthier
Fusil de 8 mm de tirailleurs sénégalais modèle 1907, Berthier
Fusil d'infanterie de 8 mm modèle 07/15, Berthier
Fusil d'infanterie de 8 mm modèle 07/15 M16, Berthier
Fusil d'infanterie de 8 mm modèle 1916, Berthier
Fusil Automatique modèle 1917
fusil semi automatique de 8 mm RSC modèle 1918
Pistolet mitrailleur de 9 mm MAS modèle 1924
Fusil d'infanterie de 7,5 mm modèle 07-15 M34
Mousqueton d'artillerie de 8 mm modèle 1916
Fusil d'infanterie de 7,5 mm modèle 1886 M93 M27
Mousqueton de cavalerie de 8 mm modèle 1886 M93 R35
Fusil d'infanterie de 7,5 mm modèle MAS 36
Pistolet mitrailleur de 7,65 mm modèle 1938
Pistolet automatique de 7,65 mm long modèle 1935 S
Fusil de 7,5 mm modèle MAS 36 CR 39
Fusil d'entraînement MAS 36 de 5,5mm (.22 LR)
Fusil d'entraînement MAS 45 de 5,5mm (.22 LR)
Carabine semi automatique de 5,5mm, 1946 (.22 LR)
Fusil juxtaposé MAS calibre 12, 1946
Carabine MAS 7×57mm, 1946
Carabine MAS 10,75×68mm, 1946
Carabine MAS 8×60mm, 1946
Carabine MAS-Fournier 7×54mm, 1947
Fusil semi automatique MAS 40
Fusil semi automatique MAS 44
Fusil semi automatique MAS 49
Carabine Mitrailleuse de 7,65 mm MAS modèle 1948
Carabine Mitrailleuse de 7,65 mm MAS modèle 1949
Carabine Mitrailleuse de 7,62 mm MAS modèle 1949
Carabine Mitrailleuse de 7,62 mm MAS modèle 1950
Carabine Mitrailleuse de 7,62 mm MAS modèle 1951
Pistolet mitrailleur de 9 mm MAS modèle 1948
Fusil de 7,5mm modèle MAS 36 LG 48
Fusil à répétition MAS modèle 36 modifié 51
Pistolet automatique modèle 1950
Fusil Automatique de 7,5 mm MAS modèle 1951
Fusil Automatique de 7,5 mm MAS modèle 1952
Arme Automatique modèle AA-52
Arme Automatique modèle AA NF1 de 7,62 mm
Fusil Automatique de 7,62 mm MAS modèle 1952
Fusil Automatique de 7,5 mm MAS modèle 1952, Bullpup
Fusil Automatique de 7,62 mm MAS modèle 1952
Fusil Automatique de 7,62 mm MAS modèle 1953
Fusil Automatique de 7,62 mm MAS modèle 1953, Bullpup
Fusil Mitrailleur de 7,62 mm MAS modèle 1953
Fusil Automatique MAS 54 A, B & C
Fusil Automatique de 7,62 mm MAS modèle 1954
Fusil Automatique de 7,62 mm MAS modèle 1954, Bullpup
Fusil Mitrailleur de 7,62 mm MAS modèle 1954
Fusil Automatique de 7,62 mm MAS modèle 1955
Fusil Automatique de 7,62 mm MAS modèle 1955, Bullpup
Fusil Automatique de 7,62 mm MAS modèle 1955
Fusil Automatique de 7,62 mm MAS modèle 1956
Fusil semi automatique MAS 49/56
MAC-58
Fusil Automatique de 7,62 mm MAS modèle 1958
Fusil Automatique de 7,62 mm MAS A.P. modèle 1959
Fusil Automatique de 7,62 mm MAS A.P. modèle 1959 type P.M
Fusil Automatique de 7,62 mm MAS A.P. modèle 1959 type F.M
Fusil Automatique de 7,62 mm MAS A.P. modèle 1960
Fusil Automatique de 7,62 mm MAS A.P. modèle 1961
Fusil Automatique de 7,62 mm MAS modèle T 62
Fusil a répétition de précision FR-F1
Fusil Automatique Heckler & Koch G3
Fusil Automatique Heckler & Koch HK 33 F
Fusil Automatique Tritube de 5,56mm
Fusil a répétition de précision FR_F2
Pistolet automatique MAS modèle G1
Fusil d'entraînement FA MAS à plomb de 4,5mm (.177)
Fusil semi automatique cal. 223 Remington, FA MAS
Fusil semi automatique cal. 222 Remington, FA MAS
Fusil automatique de 5,56 mm modèle F1, FA MAS
Fusil automatique de 5,56 mm modèle G1, FA MAS
Fusil automatique de 5,56 mm modèle G2, FA MAS
Fusil automatique de 5,56 mm modèle FELIN V1, FA MAS
Fusil automatique de 5,56 mm modèle FELIN V2, FA MAS
PAPOP, Poly Arme, Poly Projectile, 35mm/ 5,56mm, French ACR
Pistolet mitrailleur de 9 mm HK MP5 F

See also
Manufacture d'armes de Châtellerault
Manufacture d´armes de Bayonne
Manufacture Nationale d'Armes de Tulle

Sources
 Danel, Raymond and Cuny, Jean. L'aviation française de bombardement et de renseignement (1918/1940), Docavia n°12, Editions Larivière.
 De Vries, G. and Martens, B.J. The MKb 42, MP43, MP44 and the Sturmgewehr 44, Propaganda Photo Series, Volume IV, Special Interest Publicaties BV, Arnhem, The Netherlands, First Edition, 2001.
 Ezell, Edward Clinton.  Small Arms of the World, Arms & Armour Press, London, 1977, Eleventh edition.
 Ferrard, Stéphane. France 1940 l'armement terrestre, ETAI, 1998. 
 Gotz, Hans Dieter. German Military Rifles and Machine Pistols, 1871-1945, Schiffer Publishing, West Chester, Pennsylvania, 1990. 
 Huon, Jean. Les fusils d'assaut français, Editions Barnett, 1998. .
 Pelletier, Alain. French Fighters of World War II, Squadron/Signal Publications, Inc., Carrollton, Texas, 2002. 
 Smith, W.H.B.  Small Arms of the World : The Basic Manual of Military Small Arms, Stackpole Books, Harrisburg, Pa., 1955. 
 Wollert, Günter; Lidschun, Reiner; Kopenhagen, Wilfried. Illustrierte Enzyklopädie der Schützenwaffen aus aller Welt: Schützenwaffen heute (1945–1985), Militärverlag der Deutschen Demokratischen Republik, Berlin, 1988. 
 Deutsches Waffen Journal
 Visier
 Schweizer Waffen Magazin
 Internationales Waffen Magazin
 Cibles
 AMI
 Gazette des Armes
 Action Guns
 Guns & Ammo
 American Handgunner
 SWAT Magazine
 Diana Armi
 Armi & Tiro

Notes
"French autoloading rifles. 1898-1979 (Proud promise), by Jean Huon, 1995, Collector Grade Publications. . This volume ( in English )contains a detailed technical chapter describing the Lebel rifle and its ammunition. This volume primarily describes all French semi-automatic rifles since 1898, notably the Mle 1917 and Mle 1918 semi-automatic rifles, the Meunier (A6) rifle as well as the MAS 38-40 to MAS49 and 49/56 series.
"La Manufacture Nationale d'Armes de Châtellerault(1819-1968)", Claude Lombard, 1987, Brissaud,162 Grande Rue, Poitiers,  .  This illustrated volume ( in French ) contains the production statistics for the Lebel rifle as well as complete technical accounts on the Gras, Kropatschek, Lebel and Berthier weapons and how they came to be designed and manufactured. This is regarded as the fundamental research volume on the subject. The author is a retired armament engineer who spent most of his career at Châtellerault and had full access to all the archives and the prototypes.
"Military rifle and machine gun cartridges", Jean Huon, 1988, Ironside International Publishers, Alexandria, VA, . This volume (in English) provides a detailed description of all the types of 8 mm Lebel ammunition, including the Balle D (a.m.).  The 7 X 59 mm Meunier cartridge ( for the semi-automatic A6 Meunier rifle ) is also illustrated and described in detail.
"Standard Catalog of Military Firearms", Ned Schwing, 2003, Krause Publications, .   Contains an informative and detailed page dedicated to the Lebel rifle (by David Fortier).
"The Chauchat Machine Rifle (Honour Bound) , Gerard Demaison and Yves Buffetaut, 1995, Collector Grade Publications, The 10 pages illustrated appendix at the end of this volume ( in English) exhaustively describes all the 8 mm Lebel ball ammunition types, plus the less well-known blank, tracer, armor-piercing, incendiary, dummy and proof rounds. This appendix was documented and authored by internationally known cartridge expert Dr Ph. Regenstreif.
Bolt Action Rifles, Frank de Haas and Wayne Van Zwoll, 2003, Krause Publications, . An illustrated chapter in this volume reviews in depth the Lebel and Berthier rifles (and carbines).

External links
 http://armesfrancaises.free.fr/sommaire.html (in French), one of the best sites related to French small arms
  Buddy Hinton MAS 44 MAS 49 Mas 49/56 Photo Collection
  Buddy Hinton FAMAS Photo Collection / World's Largest
  Revolver MAS 1873
 Buffalo Lebel training rifle

Defence companies of France
Firearm manufacturers of France
Organizations based in Saint-Étienne
Monuments historiques of Loire (department)
Nexter Systems